Reggie Bradshaw (born March 4, 1984) is a former professional Canadian football running back. He was drafted by the Saskatchewan Roughriders in the fifth round of the 2007 CFL Draft. He played college football for the Montana Grizzlies.

Bradshaw has also been a member of the Calgary Stampeders.

External links
Calgary Stampeders bio

1984 births
Living people
Players of Canadian football from British Columbia
Canadian football running backs
Montana Grizzlies football players
Saskatchewan Roughriders players
Calgary Stampeders players